KFGE (98.1 FM) is a radio station broadcasting a country music format licensed to Milford, Nebraska, United States. The station serves the Lincoln area. Studios are located at Broadcast House at 44th Street and East O Street in Lincoln, while its transmitter is located near Utica. It is one of several stations across the United States that uses the "Froggy" branding.

The current 98.1 station dates to July 15, 1996. Froggy had been started at 105.3 MHz (now KLNC) on February 3, 1992.

Since August 2007, the station has been owned by NRG Media. In August 2007, Triad Broadcasting sold the station, along with its sister stations in the Lincoln market, to NRG.

References

Current Logo

External links

FGE
NRG Media radio stations
Country radio stations in the United States